The 2020–21 season is Bolton Wanderers's first season in the fourth tier of English football since 1988, and only their second overall, following their relegation from EFL League One to EFL League Two. It covers the period from 1 July 2020 to 30 June 2021.

Squad

First team

Out on loan

Youth players with first team appearances

Youth players with first team squad numbers

Background
Bolton had begun the 2019–20 EFL League One season with a twelve-point reduction and never recovered. When the season was suspended and then abandoned due to the COVID-19 pandemic they had never risen above bottom place and were subsequently relegated to EFL League Two on 9 June with a points per game ratio of 0.41. Three days later, the club announced that both manager Keith Hill and his assistant David Flitcroft would not have their contracts, which ran until 30 June, extended. On 15 June, Ronan Darcy signed his first professional contract with the club, keeping him at the club until 2022. On 26 June Bolton announced that they would be releasing 14 senior players at the end of their contracts on 1 July, though also stated that when a new manager was hired they would be allowed to offer the players new contracts if they desired. On 24 June 2020 Bolton Wanderers made an official approach to Barrow for Evatt to become their manager, and Barrow demanded £250,000 compensation should he make the move. Two days later Barrow rejected Bolton's bid for his services, stating it was below the £250,000 they had asked for. On 29 June, Bolton and Barrow agreed on compensation and Bolton began discussing personal terms with Evatt. Evatt's appointment at Bolton was confirmed on 1 July 2020. On 3 July Ali Crawford returned to the club, signing a new two-year contract. The club confirmed on 9 July that Home Bargains would continue to be primary shirt sponsor for the forthcoming season. Bolton's first signing was the leading goalscorer of the 2019–20 EFL League Two season, Eoin Doyle. This was followed by the signings of Antoni Sarcevic on 15 July, George Taft on 20 July and Brandon Comley on 21 July. The same day that the club signed Comley, they announced that long serving academy director, former player and sometime caretaker manager Jimmy Phillips would be leaving his role, ending a thirty-year association with the club. On 28 July, the club announced their first loan signing of the summer with Tom White joining from Blackburn Rovers for the season. July ended with the club confirming the return of Macron as their kit supplier.

Bolton started August with the signing of Liam Gordon on a two-year deal. Further signings that month were permanent deals for Ricardo Santos, Reiss Greenidge, Gethin Jones, Nathan Delfouneso, Matt Gilks, Jak Hickman, Jamie Mascoll and Alex Baptiste, who had previously played for the club between 2013 and 2015. A season long loan deal for Billy Crellin was also completed.

Pre-season friendlies
On 24 July Bolton announced a Pre-season friendly against F.C. United of Manchester on 12 August. However, the game never took place. They played unannounced pre-season friendlies against Atherton Collieries on 1 August, winning 3–0, Bamber Bridge on 8 August, winning 7–0, and Loughborough University on 11 August, winning 6–0. In the match against Loughborough University Dennis Politic was injured and it was confirmed on 20 August that he was likely to miss the whole of the forthcoming season. On 14 August Bolton announced they would play their final pre-season friendly against Championship side Blackburn Rovers on 29 August, but this was soon cancelled after Blackburn's EFL Cup match was brought forward. As a replacement, Crewe Alexandra announced they would be playing against Bolton on 28 August. Bolton beat League One side Accrington Stanley 3–0 on 22 August, but their pre-season 100% record was ended when a youthful Bolton side lost 5–1 to local rivals Wigan Athletic on 25 August. Bolton finished Pre-season with a 0–3 home defeat to newly promoted League One side Crewe Alexandra. A day later the club announced that Antoni Sarcevic had been named club captain for the forthcoming season.

Competitions

EFL League Two

League table

Results summary

Results by matchday

Matches
The fixtures for the 2020–21 EFL League Two season were released on 21 August and saw Bolton opening their campaign at home to Forest Green Rovers on 12 September. The regular season concluded on 8 May with a trip to Crawley Town.

FA Cup

The draw for the first round was made on Monday 26, October.

EFL Cup

Bolton will enter the EFL Cup at the first round stage, along with all other League One and League Two club and the majority of Championship clubs. The draw was made on 18 August and saw Bolton face Bradford City in the first round.

EFL Trophy

On 17 August, Bolton were drawn with Crewe Alexandra and Shrewsbury Town in the group stage of the EFL Trophy. The regional group stage draw was confirmed on 18 August with Newcastle United U21 completing the group.

Statistics

|-
! colspan="14" style="background:#dcdcdc; text-align:center"| Goalkeepers

|-
! colspan="14" style="background:#dcdcdc; text-align:center"| Defenders

|-
! colspan="14" style="background:#dcdcdc; text-align:center"| Midfielders

|-
! colspan="14" style="background:#dcdcdc; text-align:center"| Forwards

|-
|colspan=14|Out on loan:

|-
|colspan=14|Left during the season:
|-

|}

Goals record

Disciplinary record

Transfers

Transfers in

Loans in

Loans out

Transfers out

References

Bolton Wanderers F.C. seasons
Bolton Wanderers